Siriri is a municipality located in the Brazilian state of Sergipe. Its population was 8,970 (2020) and its area is 169 km².

References

Municipalities in Sergipe